Dedni Vrh pri Vojniku is a settlement in the Municipality of Vojnik in eastern Slovenia. It lies just south of Frankolovo off the main road from Vojnik towards Slovenske Konjice. The area is part of the traditional region of Styria. It is now included with the rest of the municipality in the Savinja Statistical Region.

History
Dedni Vrh pri Vojniku became an independent settlement in 2000, when its territory was ceded by Ilovca, Frankolovo, and Rove.

References

External links
Dedni Vrh pri Vojniku at Geopedia

Populated places in the Municipality of Vojnik